Tannous is a surname. Notable people with the surname include:

 Dominique Tannous, Lebanese fencer
 Ibrahim Tannous (1929–2012), Lebanese military officer
 Mohammad Tannous (born 1992), Jordanian football player